The 1985–86 Fairfield Stags men's basketball team represented Fairfield University in the 1985–86 NCAA Division I men's basketball season. The Stags, led by first year head coach Mitch Buonaguro, played their home games at Alumni Hall in Fairfield, Connecticut as members of the Metro Atlantic Athletic Conference. They finished the season 24–7, 13–1 in MAAC play to win the conference regular season title. They also won the MAAC tournament to earn an automatic bid to the NCAA tournament as No. 13 seed in the Southeast region. Making their first appearance in the NCAA Tournament, the Stags were beaten by No. 4 seed Illinois, 75–51.

Roster

Schedule and results 

|-
!colspan=12 style=| Regular season

|-
!colspan=12 style=| MAAC Tournament

|-
!colspan=12 style=| NCAA Tournament

|-

Source

References

Fairfield Stags men's basketball seasons
Fairfield Stags
Fairfield
Fairfield Stags men's basketball
Fairfield Stags men's basketball